The New in You is a 1985 album by the California State University, Los Angeles Jazz Ensemble. It was the group's first recording under the direction of David Caffey. The group's student musicians have included Sharon Hirata, Luis Bonilla, Phil Feather, Jack Cooper, Charlie Richard, Mark Gutierrez, and Jose Arellano.

Background 

In 1984 and 1985 the California State University, Los Angeles Music Department and CSULA Associated Students decided to fund LP recordings of the jazz ensemble to better serve as a teaching tool for student music, jazz groups.   The New In You is the first of six albums to come from CSULA during the 1980s featuring the award winning CSULA #1 Jazz Ensemble.  The LP contains tracks from the #1 CSULA Jazz Ensemble to include compositions of three students, one from the director (professor David Caffey), and two from Neil Slater.    
 
There is a consistent tradition of musicians coming from the CSULA program who have worked with major musical acts, on major studio and movie projects, and hold positions in higher education in music.   The roster on this album is self-evident as to the diversity and level of student musicians CSULA developed at that time and had for many years dating far back to musicians (graduates) such as Lennie Niehaus and Gabe Baltazar.

Track listing

Recording Sessions 
 Recorded: May 25 and 31 1985, Sage and Sound Recording, Hollywood, California
 Mixing: June 14, 1985 Sage and Sound Recording, Hollywood, California

Print music from this recording 

Inside Outfluence is published by Neil Slater Publications
The New In You was commissioned by the Cypress College Jazz Ensemble, George Beyer - director and is published by UNC Jazz Press
Sierra Sunset is published by UNC Jazz Press
Struttin''' is published by UNC Jazz PressPlaces'' is published by Neil Slater Publications

Personnel

Musicians 
Conductor: David Caffey
Saxes and woodwinds: Charlie Richard, Sharon Hirata, Phil Feather, Jack Cooper, Randall Wills, David Holland, Scott Ackerman
Trumpets and flugelhorns: Tim Neff, Ken Montgomery, Barry Russell, John Le Febvre
Trombones: Gary Smith, Luis Bonilla, José Arellano, John Sandhagen
Guitar and Piano: Mark Gutierrez
Bass: Gerald Stockton
Drums: John Severino

Production 
Recording engineers: Jim Mooney
Mixing engineers: Jim Mooney and David Caffey
Mastering: K Disc
Cover art: Randy Piland

References

External links
The New in You at Allmusic Guide

1985 albums
California State University, Los Angeles Jazz Ensemble albums